Sortilin-related receptor, L(DLR class) A repeats containing is a protein that in humans is encoded by the SORL1 gene.

SORL1 (also known as SORLA, SORLA1, or LR11) is a neuronal apolipoprotein E receptor, the gene for which is predominantly expressed in the central nervous system.

Clinical significance 

Mutation of the gene for apolipoprotein E (APOE) is predictive of Alzheimer's disease. Lack of the APOE receptor is suspected to be a contributory factor to Alzheimer's: a significant reduction in SORL1 (LR11) expression has been found in brain tissue of Alzheimer's disease patients. The APOE receptor has also been linked with regulation of amyloid precursor protein, faulty processing of which is implicated in Alzheimer's. A more recent study by a group of international researchers  supports the  proposition that SORL1 plays a part in seniors developing Alzheimer's disease, the findings being significant across racial and ethnic strata.

See also 
 Apolipoprotein E

References

External links 
 SORL1 references from NCBI.
 "Study Detects a Gene Linked to Alzheimer’s".  N. Wade, New York Times, Jan. 15, 2007.

Alzheimer's disease